The Hungarian Croats (Croatian: Hrvati u Mađarskoj) are an ethnic minority in Hungary. According to the 2011 census, there were 26,774 Croats in Hungary or 0.3% of population.

Croats of Hungary belong to several ethnographic subgroups. The following groups called themselves through history as Croats: Burgenland Croats, Podravina Croats, Pomurje Croats. These Croats live along the Croatian-Hungarian border and along the Austrian-Hungarian border. There are also Bunjevci and Šokci.

Ethnology

The common ethnonym and autonym is horvátok (Croats). They live in Baranya, in the city of Pécs, also in the villages Kökény, Szemely, Udvar, Szalánta (they came there in the 18th century; today they make 32% of the village population), Pécsudvard, Németi, Pogány et cetera. Until recently, Croat Bosniak Catholics were the significant community in  Áta, Szőke and Szőkéd, but those Croats have significantly magyarized.

In the village of Hercegszántó there is a community of Šokci. In Bács-Kiskun, the community of Bunjevci declare as Bunjevci or Croats. Croats immigrated in the Early modern period.

Geography
Croat communities are scattered in several parts of Hungary, mostly in the western and southern part of the country, and along the Danube, including Budapest with neighbourhood.

According to 2011 population census, 7,185 Croats live in Baranya County, 3,770 in Zala County, 3,502 in Bacs-Kiskun County, 3,197 in Vas County, 3,028 in Győr-Moson-Sopron County, 2,186 Croats live in Budapest, 1,547 in Somogy County, 980 in Pest County, 358 in Csongrád-Csanád County, 353 in Fejer County, 178 in Tolna County, 131 in Veszprem County etc.

Cultural institutions 
Scientific Institute of Croats of Hungary
Croat Theatre of Pécs
Hrvatski glasnik

Notable people 
Notable Hungarian Croats or Hungarians of Croat descent.

Flórián Albert, footballer (Šokci mother).
Ivan Antunović, Catholic bishop (Bunjevci)
Blanka Bíró, Hungarian handballer
István Blazsetin
István Gyurity, Hungarian actor
György Garics, Hungarian footballer
Gyula Lóránt (born Lipovics), Hungarian footballer
Miklós Páncsics, footballer.
Petar Pekić, Croatian historian (Bunjevci)

See also 
 List of Croats

Sources and references 
  Croatica Kht. Dinko Šokčević: Povijest Hrvata u Mađarskoj

External links
 Radio Croatica Znanstveni skup o bošnjačkim Hrvatima u Kukinju, November 22, 2008
 Nemzeti és etnikai kisebbségek Magyarországon Dinko Šokčević: Bosnyák-horvátok
 Honismeret dr Gábriel András: Bosnyákok Baranyában

 
Hungary
Ethnic groups in Hungary